Pakistan Institute for Parliamentary Services (PIPS) was established in December 2008 by the Parliament of Pakistan and is located in Islamabad.
پاکستان
In May 2012, Under Secretary of State for Public Diplomacy and Public Affairs Tara Sonenshine joined U.S. Ambassador Cameron Munter and National Assembly Speaker Dr. Fahmida Mirza, in Islamabad, to celebrate the opening of the Pakistan Institute for Parliamentary Service (PIPS).

The Institute helps and trains the members of the Pakistan parliament and their staff in drafting bills and motions to be introduced in the Parliament of Pakistan. This institute was formed since many newly elected members of the parliament and their staff needed training in the Parliamentary procedures. The institute provides legislative research and for effective strong legislature in Pakistan.

The Pakistan Institute for Parliamentary Services (PIPS) is an institution created to provide research and capacity building services for parliamentarians and parliamentary functionaries. The establishment of a sustainable institute for legislative research and capacity building has been a long-standing aspiration of parliamentarians and parliamentary staff in Pakistan. The establishment of the Pakistan Institute for Parliamentary Services, PIPS, through an Act of Parliament is a major step towards the realization of this objective.
Strategically placed in the aegis of the Parliament of Pakistan,

Establishing PIPS 

The Pakistan Institute for Parliamentary Services, PIPS, was formally established as an exclusive and independent, first of its kind research and capacity building facility for the parliamentarians, through an Act of Parliament on December 15, 2008. No matter it had started functioning in an interim facility since April 2006. The Parliament in Pakistan had remained deprived of the power of Knowledge that comes from timely, accurate and credible information and objective bipartisan analysis on the most sensitive of national matters till the establishment of PIPS. The intense need for such an institution was direly felt and expressed in 2005 in the Speakers Conference of the National and Provincial houses. The Legislative Development Steering Committee (LDSC) of the National Parliament under the chairmanship of Deputy Speaker National Assembly chose to work for setting up the institute with the support of the Pakistan Legislative Strengthening Project (PLSP). Based on the deliberations of the LDSC, comprising eight MNAs and four Senators in addition to Secretariat leadership of National Assembly and the Senate; various comparative studies and feasibility papers prepared by PLSP and the LDSC steered the initiative. The LDSC visualized PIPS as an autonomous entity, functioning under the leadership of the parliament and guided by a Board of Governors.

Cross Party Consensus to Pass PIPS Act 

The members of two National Assemblies 2002 and 2008 and the Senate joined hands in not only envisioning the project but also steering it through legislation and across party advocacy. In fact PIPS legislation is a true manifestation of cross party caucusing in both the Senate and the National Assembly of Pakistan. The PIPS bill saw all parliamentary parties, government and the opposition working together. The bill was drafted by former Senator Ch Muhammad Anwer Bhinder from Pakistan Muslim League, (Quaid e Azam) PML Q, and ably supported by the former LDSC members such as former Deputy Speaker National Assembly Sardar Muhammad Yaqoub PML Q, Senator Ms Rukhsana Zuberi, Pakistan Peoples Party PPP, and Senator Azam Khan Swati JUI(F), Awami National Party ANP, respectively. Members of the 2008 LDSC, MNAs Dr Azra Fazal Pechuho, Deputy Speaker Mr Fasial Karim Kundi, Ms Yasmeen Rehman (all from PPP) and MNA Mr Ayaz Sadiq, Pakistan Muslim League (Nawaz) PML N, contributed to finally get it through in the 13th National Assembly as a consensus Act. We acknowledge that USAID PLSP founding Chief of Party Eleanor Valentine and two of her successors – Christopher Shields and Carmen Lane –actively assisted the parliament in general and the LDSC in particular to make PIPS a reality. The institute was thus officially created through a consensus Act of Parliament passed in December 2008.

PIPS Board of Governors - Reflection of Federation of Pakistan 

The establishment of the PIPS through unanimous support of the Parliament reflected the will and vision of not only the National Assembly and Senate, but also of the provincial Houses of Punjab, Sindh, Khyber Pakhtunkhwa, and Balochistan, who are all represented through their Speakers in the PIPS Board of Governors. Under the Act, the Chairman Senate and Speaker National Assembly were charged with the responsibility of nominating the members of the founding BOG. Considering the importance of the institute and the role of the Board of Governors, they tried to pick up the best of the lot keeping in view their background and experience for taking up this onerous responsibility. The Board of Governors, chaired by Chairman Senate or Speaker National Assembly by three-year rotation, has the overall control of the Institute and it guides its functioning. Executive Director is the chief executive of the institute and works under the control of the Board. Speaker of the National Assembly Madam Fehmida Mirza became the founding President of the PIPS Board of Governors, who along with Deputy Chairman Senate, Senator Mir Jan Muhammad Khan Jamali inaugurated the official construction launch of PIPS building in June 2010. The Board, which thoroughly drafted, debated and approved comprehensive sets of Financial and Recruitment Rules that has laid a sound foundation to build a centre of excellence based on professionalism and merit, which reflects integrity and accountability in its functioning. The Board also appointed former Secretary General of National Assembly Mr Khan Ahmad Goraya as its founding executive director.

PIPS Role and Functions 

PIPS is committed to serve all national and provincial legislatures in their efforts to perform their onerous tasks of law making, executive oversight, policy making and representation according to the aspirations and will of the people of Pakistan and to strengthen the tradition of a democratic order in the country. According to the mandate of the Institute as mentioned in the PIPS Act, the functions of the institute are as follows:
 to maintain the national, provincial and international data, information and statistics to provide to the Parliamentarians for the efficient performance of their duties;
 to undertake research in respect of the Federal and Provincial laws and also to have a study of international laws to help the Parliamentarians in the law making process;
 to provide technical assistance to Parliamentarians in performance of their duties;
 to provide training to the Parliamentarians and parliamentary functionaries for performance of their duties;
 to arrange seminars, workshops or conferences;
 to take measures for the development of law making;
 to maintain a record of all the existing Act, Ordinances and other enactments in force in Pakistan and in each Province;
 to assist Parliamentarians and legislative bodies in their efforts to ensure the public's understanding of working of Parliament;
 to arrange legislative drafting courses with special emphasis on parliamentary practices;
 to manage the internship programs for the Parliament and Provincial Assemblies;
 to establish and maintain resource centers for the Parliamentarians;
 to support the parliamentary committees in the performance of their duties;
 any other function as may be assigned to it by the Parliament or the Board

Board of Governors (as on December 1st, 2015)

External links 
 Pakistan Institute for Parliamentary Services

References 

 
Pakistan federal departments and agencies
2008 establishments in Pakistan